Love's Old Sweet Song is a 1917 British silent drama film directed by F. Martin Thornton and starring Evelyn Boucher, Lionel Belcher and Clifford Pembroke. It takes its title from the song of the same name.

Cast
 Evelyn Boucher as Ruth Mereton  
 Lionel Belcher as Dan Ash  
 Clifford Pembroke as Robert Ash  
 Rita Otway as Muriel Mereton  
 Jeff Barlow as Farmer Mereton  
 George Bogue as Stephen Craine  
 Hayford Hobbs as Lord Frederick Armitage

References

Bibliography
 Low, Rachael. The History of the British Film 1914-1918. Routledge, 2005.

External links

1917 films
1917 drama films
British silent feature films
British drama films
1910s English-language films
Films directed by Floyd Martin Thornton
British black-and-white films
1910s British films
Silent drama films